Frank Thomson "Tom" Leighton (born 1956) is the CEO of Akamai Technologies, the company he co-founded with the late Daniel Lewin in 1998. As one of the world's preeminent authorities on algorithms for network applications and cybersecurity, Dr. Leighton discovered a solution to free up web congestion using applied mathematics and distributed computing.

He is on leave as a professor of applied mathematics and a member of the Computer Science and Artificial Intelligence Laboratory (CSAIL) at the Massachusetts Institute of Technology (MIT). He received his B.S.E. in Electrical Engineering from Princeton University in 1978, and his Ph.D. in Mathematics from MIT in 1981. His brother David T. Leighton is a full professor at the University of Notre Dame, specializing in transport phenomena. Their father was a U.S. Navy colleague and friend of Admiral Hyman G. Rickover, the father of naval nuclear propulsion and a founder of the Research Science Institute (RSI).

Dr. Leighton has served on numerous government, industry, and academic advisory panels, including the Presidential Informational Technology Advisory Committee (PITAC) and chaired its subcommittee on cybersecurity. He serves on the board of trustees of the Society for Science & the Public (SSP) and of the Center for Excellence in Education (CEE), and he has participated in the Distinguished Lecture Series at CEE's flagship program for high school students, the Research Science Institute (RSI).

Awards and honors

 The Institute of Electrical and Electronics Engineers (IEEE) awarded Leighton the John von Neumann Medal in 2023 for “fundamental contributions to algorithm design and their application to content delivery networks.”
 In 2018, Leighton won the Marconi Prize from the Marconi Society for "his fundamental contributions to the technology and establishment of content delivery networks". 
 He was elected as an ACM Fellow in 2018 for "his leadership in the establishment of content delivery networks, and his contributions to algorithm design".
 In 2017, Leighton and Lewin were inducted into the National Inventors Hall of Fame, for Content Delivery Network methods.
 He is a Fellow of the American Academy of Arts and Sciences
 In 2012, Leighton became a fellow of the American Mathematical Society. 
 In 2008, Leighton was appointed as a member of the United States National Academy of Sciences. 
 In 2004, Leighton was elected a member of the National Academy of Engineering for contributions to the design of networks and circuits and for technology for Web content delivery.
 In 2001, Leighton received the IEEE Computer Society Charles Babbage Award.
 In 1981, Leighton was named the first winner of the Machtey Award.

Personal life
He is married to the MIT professor Bonnie Berger, and they have two children.

Books
 Introduction to Parallel Algorithms and Architectures: Arrays, Trees, Hypercubes (Morgan Kaufmann, 1991), .
 Complexity Issues in VLSI: Optimal layouts for the shuffle-exchange graph and other networks, (MIT Press, 1983), .
 Mathematics for Computer Science (with Eric Lehman and Albert R. Meyer, 2010)

References

External links

 CSAIL bio
 Akamai bio

American computer scientists
Theoretical computer scientists
Living people
Fellows of the American Mathematical Society
Fellows of the Society for Industrial and Applied Mathematics
Fellows of the Association for Computing Machinery
Members of the United States National Academy of Engineering
Members of the United States National Academy of Sciences
Princeton University School of Engineering and Applied Science alumni
Massachusetts Institute of Technology School of Science alumni
Massachusetts Institute of Technology faculty
20th-century American engineers
21st-century American engineers
20th-century American scientists
21st-century American scientists
1956 births
Akamai Technologies people